The Sixth Commandment is an upcoming four-part BBC One British true-life crime drama written by Sarah Phelps and starring Timothy Spall, Anne Reid, Sheila Hancock, Éanna Hardwicke, Annabel Scholey and Ben Bailey Smith. It is from Wild Mercury Productions and True Vision Productions, directed by Saul Dibb and produced by Frances du Pille.

Synopsis
The story will explore the deaths of Peter Farquhar and Ann Moore-Martin in Buckinghamshire in 2014 and 2017 and the subsequent events including the police investigation and 2019 criminal trial of Ben Field.

Cast
Timothy Spall as Peter Farquhar
Anne Reid as Ann Moore-Martin
Éanna Hardwicke as Ben Field
Annabel Scholey
Sheila Hancock 
Ben Bailey Smith
Conor MacNeill 
Adrian Rawlins
Amanda Root

Production

Development
The project was first announced in November 2020 by the BBC to “explore the death of Mr Farquhar and the gaslighting campaign of physical and mental abuse he was made to endure at the hands of church warden Benjamin Field.” Sarah Phelps was announced as penning the screenplay.

In June 2022 the project was announced as moving forward with Wild Mercury Productions and True Vision Productions making the four-part series for BBC One. It is directed by Saul Dibb, from a Phelps script, with production by Frances du Pille. The project is executive produced Derek Wax, Brian Woods and Lucy Richer as well as Dibbs and Phelps. It confirmed the project had the full co-operation of Peter Farquhar and Ann Moore-Martin’s families.

Casting
In June 2022 Timothy Spall, Anne Reid, Éanna Hardwicke, Annabel Scholey and Sheila Hancock were announced as the lead cast.

Filming
Filming took place in Bristol and Bath, Somerset from July 2022. The shoot lasted three months for Hardwicke.

Broadcast
The series is expected to air on BBC One in 2023.

References

External links

  
Upcoming television series
2023 British television series debuts
2020s British drama television series
2020s British television miniseries
BBC television dramas
English-language television shows
Television shows shot in Bristol